Mario Basler (born 18 December 1968) is a German football manager and former professional player who mainly played as a right midfielder. He is currently at TSG Eisenberg as a player and advisor.

A dead-ball specialist, Basler scored numerous goals from free-kicks and two directly from corner kicks during his career, colloquially known as Olympic goals. He was also known for his creativity.

Club career
Born in Neustadt an der Weinstraße, Basler started his career with 1. FC Kaiserslautern, making only one league appearance. In 1993, he joined Bundesliga club SV Werder Bremen, after previously playing for Hertha BSC and Rot-Weiss Essen in the 2. Bundesliga. With Bremen, Basler won the DFB-Pokal in 1994 and finished runner-up in the Bundesliga in 1995. During the 1994–95 season, he was joint top-goalscorer in the Bundesliga with 20 goals.

Basler joined FC Bayern Munich in 1996, where he won the Bundesliga title in 1997 and 1999, and scored the club's winning goal in the 1998 DFB-Pokal final. Basler also scored the opening goal for Bayern Munich in their 1999 UEFA Champions League Final against Manchester United at Camp Nou, Barcelona with a free-kick in the sixth minute of the game. Bayern went on to lose the match 2–1.

Basler rejoined Kaiserslautern in 1999, reaching the UEFA Cup semi-finals in 2001 and the final of the 2002–03 DFB-Pokal, where die roten Teufel were beaten by Basler's former club Bayern Munich.

International career
Basler played 30 games for the Germany national team between 1994 and 1998 and scored two goals. He was named in the squad for the 1994 World Cup, and Euro 1996, the latter of which Germany won, although Basler didn't make any appearances in the tournament.

International goals
Scores and results list Germany's goal tally first, score column indicates score after each Basler goal.

Coaching career
Basler began his coaching career 2004 as head coach of SSV Jahn Regensburg but was sacked after few months. In July 2007 he became assistant coach of TuS Koblenz. After only one year he left TuS Koblenz to sign a contract as head coach and manager with SV Eintracht Trier 05. On 21 February 2010, he was fired by his club Eintracht Trier. He was appointed as manager of SV Wacker Burghausen in August of the same year. When Burghausen was relegated at the end of the 2010–11 season, Basler was sacked.

Basler took over as coach of Rot-Weiß Oberhausen in October 2011 but resigned from his position on 14 September 2012 after four losses in seven games.

In February 2015, Basler got the job as sports director for 1.FC Lokomotive Leipzig.

Coaching record

Honours

Werder Bremen
 DFB-Pokal: 1993–94
 DFL-Supercup: 1993, 1994

Bayern Munich
 Bundesliga: 1996–97, 1998–99
 DFB-Pokal: 1997–98
 DFB-Ligapokal: 1997, 1998
 UEFA Champions League runner-up: 1998–99

Germany
 UEFA European Championship: 1996

Individual
 kicker Torjägerkanone Award: 1994–95 Bundesliga top scorer
 kicker Bundesliga Team of the Season: 1994–95

See also
Mario Basler: Jetzt geht's los!, Super NES game endorsed by Basler

References

External links
 

1968 births
Living people
People from Neustadt an der Weinstraße
German footballers
Germany international footballers
German expatriate footballers
Association football midfielders
Bundesliga players
2. Bundesliga players
FC Bayern Munich footballers
Hertha BSC players
1. FC Kaiserslautern players
Rot-Weiss Essen players
SV Werder Bremen players
Kicker-Torjägerkanone Award winners
1994 FIFA World Cup players
UEFA Euro 1996 players
UEFA European Championship-winning players
Al-Rayyan SC players
German football managers
SSV Jahn Regensburg managers
SV Wacker Burghausen managers
SV Eintracht Trier 05 managers
3. Liga managers
Qatar Stars League players
Footballers from Rhineland-Palatinate
West German footballers
German expatriate sportspeople in Qatar
Expatriate footballers in Qatar